Power It Up Records is a German record label mainly focused on grindcore. The label puts out both vinyl and CD. It has released records with Birdflesh, Rotten Sound, Regurgitate, Bathtub Shitter and Yacøpsæ among others.

See also
 List of record labels

External links

German record labels
Grindcore record labels